William C. Gorden (June 30, 1930 – October 23, 2020) was an American college football player and coach. He served as the head coach at Jackson State University from 1976 to 1991, compiling a record of 119–48–5. Gorden joined the Jackson State football staff as an assistant coach in 1966. He was named interim head coach during the 1976 season after the firing of Robert Hill.  His appointment as head coach was made permanent following the 1976 season. Gorden was inducted into the College Football Hall of Fame as a coach in 2008. He was an alumnus of Tennessee State University.

Gorden died October 23, 2020 at the age of 90.

Head coaching record

Football

Notes

References

External links
 

1930 births
2020 deaths
Jackson State Tigers baseball coaches
Jackson State Tigers football coaches
Tennessee State Tigers football players
College Football Hall of Fame inductees
Coaches of American football from Tennessee
Players of American football from Nashville, Tennessee
Baseball coaches from Tennessee
African-American coaches of American football
African-American players of American football
African-American baseball coaches
20th-century African-American sportspeople
21st-century African-American sportspeople